Joseph Margulies (1896–1984) was a Vienna-born American painter and printmaker.

Biography
Joseph Margulies was born in Vienna, Austria in 1896. He immigrated to the United States at an early age.  Margulies studied at the Art Students League of New York with the printmaker Joseph Pennell (1857–1926), from 1922 to 1925.  Margulies then continued his studies at the National Academy of Design, Cooper Union in New York City, and at the École des Beaux-Arts in Paris.  He also apprenticed with Maynard Waltner in Vienna. Margulies died in 1984.

Works
Margulies is best known for his portrait prints and seascapes of the New England coast, as typified by Gloucester Fisherman.  The Butler Institute of American Art (Youngstown, Ohio), the Library of Congress, the Metropolitan Museum of Art, the National Portrait Gallery (Washington D. C.) and Yale University Art Gallery are among the public collections holding work by Joseph Margulies.

References

 Archives of American Art, Smithsonian Archives of American Art, Washington, Archives of American Art, Smithsonian Institution, 1975.
 Katlan, Alexander W., The Palette Reveals the Artist, American Art Review, Oct. 2004.
 National Portrait Gallery (Smithsonian Institution), Smithsonian Institution National Portrait Gallery Collection Illustrated Checklist, Washington, Smithsonian Institution Press 1985.

American portrait painters
20th-century American painters
American male painters
Jewish painters
Jewish American artists
American alumni of the École des Beaux-Arts
1984 deaths
1896 births
20th-century American printmakers
20th-century American Jews
20th-century American male artists